Skeptrostachys is a genus of flowering plants from the orchid family, Orchidaceae. It is native to eastern South America (Brazil, Uruguay, Argentina, Paraguay, and Suriname).

Species accepted as of June 2014:

Skeptrostachys arechavaletanii (Barb.Rodr.) Garay - Brazil, Uruguay
Skeptrostachys balanophorostachya (Rchb.f. & Warm.) Garay - Brazil, Uruguay, Paraguay
Skeptrostachys berroana (Kraenzl.) Garay - Uruguay
Skeptrostachys congestiflora (Cogn.) Garay - Brazil
Skeptrostachys correana Szlach. - Argentina
Skeptrostachys disoides (Kraenzl.) Garay  - Brazil, Argentina, Paraguay
Skeptrostachys gigantea (Cogn.) Garay   - Brazil, Argentina, Paraguay, Uruguay
Skeptrostachys latipetala (Cogn.) Garay - Minas Gerais
Skeptrostachys paraguayensis (Rchb.f.) Garay - Brazil, Argentina, Paraguay
Skeptrostachys paranahybae (Kraenzl.) Garay - Paraná
Skeptrostachys rupestris (Lindl.) Garay - Brazil, Suriname, Paraguay, Uruguay
Skeptrostachys stenorrhynchoides Szlach. - Minas Gerais

See also 
 List of Orchidaceae genera

References

External links 

Orchids of South America
Cranichideae genera
Spiranthinae